Sarıdana is a village in the Baykan District of Siirt Province in Turkey. The village is populated by Kurds of the Hevêdan tribe and had a population of 130 in 2021.

References 

Kurdish settlements in Siirt Province
Villages in Baykan District